Dobrești is a commune in Argeș County, Muntenia, Romania. It is composed of two villages, Dobrești and Furești.

References

Communes in Argeș County
Localities in Muntenia